Helen Marie Fischer (née Schmid;  June 2, 1912 – November 29, 1986) was an American politician and activist. She fought for Alaska Statehood and women's rights. A Democrat, she served in the Alaska Territorial House of Representatives in 1957-1959 and then the Alaska House of Representatives 1959-1961 and 1971-1975 before and after Alaska became a state. In 2009, she was inaugurated into the Alaska Women's Hall of Fame.

Life and work
Helen Fischer was born in Sleepy Eye, Minnesota. She represented the 18th district of Alaska. She was a delegate at the Alaska Constitutional Convention. Fischer was one of six women at the convention. She was the first secretary for Operation Statehood. She died in 1986, in Palm Springs, California. In 2009, she was inaugurated into the Alaska Women's Hall of Fame.

Bibliography
 Alaska Statehood: the first 25 years. Alaska Video Productions (1983).

References

External links

 Helen Fischer at 100 Years of Alaska's Legislature

1912 births
1986 deaths
Delegates to Alaska's Constitutional Convention
Democratic Party members of the Alaska House of Representatives
Members of the Alaska Territorial Legislature
Politicians from Anchorage, Alaska
People from Sleepy Eye, Minnesota
People from Palm Springs, California
Women state legislators in Alaska
Women territorial legislators in Alaska
20th-century American politicians
20th-century American women politicians